Download Series Volume 7 is a live album by the rock band the Grateful Dead. It was released as a digital download on November 1, 2005, and is a three disc compilation of the band performing in 1980 on September 3 at Springfield Civic Center in Springfield, Massachusetts and September 4 at Providence Civic Center in Providence, Rhode Island. Discs one and two come from September 3 and disc three comes from the second set on September 4.

Volume 7 was mastered in HDCD by Jeffrey Norman.

Track listing

Disc one
9/3/80 Springfield Civic Center, Springfield, MA

First set:
"Mississippi Half-Step Uptown Toodeloo" > (Garcia, Hunter) - 8:26
"Franklin's Tower" (Garcia, Kreutzmann, Hunter) - 9:12
"Mama Tried" > (Haggard) - 2:26
"Mexicali Blues" (Weir, Barlow) - 5:01
"Althea" > (Garcia, Hunter) - 7:59
"Little Red Rooster" (Dixon) - 7:45
"Candyman" (Garcia, Hunter) - 7:33
"Easy To Love You" (Mydland, Barlow) - 4:30
"Let It Grow" > (Weir, Barlow) - 10:56
"Deal" (Garcia, Hunter) - 4:28
Second set:
"Feel Like A Stranger" (Weir, Barlow) - 11:15

Disc two
"High Time" (Garcia, Hunter) - 8:12
"Lost Sailor" > (Weir, Barlow) - 7:10
"Saint Of Circumstance" > (Weir, Barlow) - 6:12
"Jam" > (Grateful Dead) - 2:48
"Drums with Brent" > (Hart, Kreutzmann, Mydland) - 2:47
"Rhythm Devils" > (Hart, Kreutzmann) - 8:51
"Space" > (Garcia, Lesh, Weir) - 2:15
"He's Gone" > (Garcia, Hunter) - 9:57
"Truckin' " > (Garcia, Lesh, Weir, Hunter) - 8:11
"Black Peter" > (Garcia, Hunter) - 9:08
"Around and Around" > (Berry) - 3:58
"Johnny B. Goode" (Berry) - 4:40
Encore:
"Brokedown Palace" (Garcia, Hunter) - 5:22

Disc three
9/4/80 Providence Civic Center, Providence, RI

Second set: (missing "Samson and Delilah" and "Ramble On Rose")
"Supplication Jam" > (Weir, Barlow) - 4:36
"Estimated Prophet" > (Weir, Barlow) - 10:29
"Eyes Of The World" > (Garcia, Hunter) - 8:09
"Rhythm Devils" > (Hart, Kreutzmann) - 11:11
"Space" > (Garcia, Lesh, Weir) - 6:46
"The Other One" > (Weir, Kreutzmann) - 8:00
"Wharf Rat" > (Garcia, Hunter) - 9:49
"Goin' Down The Road Feeling Bad" > (Trad. Arr. By Grateful Dead) - 6:49
"Good Lovin' " (Resnick, Clark) - 8:04
Encore: 
"U.S. Blues" (Garcia, Hunter) - 5:25

Personnel
Grateful Dead
Jerry Garcia – lead guitar, vocals
Brent Mydland – keyboards, vocals
Mickey Hart – drums 
Bill Kreutzmann – drums
Phil Lesh – electric bass
Bob Weir – rhythm guitar, vocals

Production
Dan Healy – recording
Jeffrey Norman – mastering

References

07
2005 live albums